The 1998 Asian Badminton Championships was the 17th edition of the Badminton Asia Championships. It was held in Bangkok, Thailand, from September 2 to September 5. At the end of competitions, China took titles from three disciplines; Both the singles and Women's doubles, while South Korea won Men's doubles and Mixed doubles events.

Medalists

Medal table

Final Results

Men's singles

Women's singles

Men's doubles

Women's doubles

Mixed doubles

See also
 Medalists at the Badminton Asia Championships

References 

Asia Championships
Badminton, Asia Championships
 in Asian sport
Badminton, Asia Championships
Asia Championships
Asia Championships
Badminton Asia Championships
Badminton, Asia Championships